Boon Hui Lu (born December 11, 1993) is a Singaporean singer-songwriter and actress.

Early life and education
Boon was born on December 11, 1993, in Singapore to a self-employed courier provider father and a housewife.

Boon studied at Anglican High School. While studying at the Victoria Junior College, Boon had joined the school choir as she knew "she wanted to sing professionally". In 2015, she graduated from Nanyang Technological University's Nanyang Business School with an Accountancy degree. She was offered a job at a big accounting firm but had turned it down to pursue her music dreams.

Career 
Boon started her career as a child actress. She won the Star Awards for Young Talent for her role in the television drama Rhapsody in Blue in 2006.

In 2012, she represented Singapore in the popular Taiwanese reality TV singing competition Million Star. She also participated in the Channel 5 reality TV singing competition The Final 1 (2013) and was among the top 40 finalists.

Since she started writing songs in 2014, she has won awards at songwriting competitions such as National Environment Agency's Eco Music Challenge and the national talent competition Impresario. In June 2016, she took part in the Workplace Safety and Health Council's songwriting competition and was picked as one of the three finalist with her song titled Safety. Your Word, Your Life.

In 2016, her compositions Every day is a Miracle and Your Body Speaks were featured on Taiwanese singer Hebe Tien's album, Day by Day. In April 2016, she signed on with Taiwanese record label HIM International Music.

She starred in the Crescendo The Musical, which was performed at the Kallang Theatre, in December 2016. 

In 2017, Boon participated in 'Taiwan Hopestar' talent show.

Boon released her first album on 4 January 2019, Honestly Me.

In 2019, Boon was the guest star in Namewee's Song Never Give Up, which she also covered complete. and performed live in Singapore. Boon also won the Media's Recommended Female Songwriter of the Year award at the 2019 Global Chinese Golden Chart Awards.

Personal life 
In 2020, Boon suffered from Steatocystoma multiplex.

In August 2021, Boon announced her engagement to singer Cheong Waii Hoong, with whom she has been in an ongoing relationship since February 2021.

Filmography

Television series

Film

Discography

Albums

Soundtrack appearance

Singles

Theater

Concert

Ticketed concert

Awards and nominations

Star Awards

References

External links 
 
 
 Boon Hui Lu's channel on YouTube

Living people
1993 births
Singaporean people of Chinese descent
Singaporean television actresses
21st-century Singaporean women singers
Singaporean composers
Nanyang Technological University alumni
Victoria Junior College alumni
Singaporean singer-songwriters